= Roenik =

Swedish band

Roenik is a Swedish band formed in late 1999 by frontman and guitarist, Niels Nankler and former bass player Joel Magnusson who had known each other from birth. Jonas Lundberg (guitar/backing vocals), Jonas Wållberg (keyboard) and Christian Titus (drums) joined up with the two childhood friends in high school. Later John London replaced Joel Magnusson as the bands bassplayer.

Roenik self released the EP "Unique" in 2006 with a single called "We Could Have Been". The single held place 19 for two weeks on the Swedishchart ("Hitlistan") in February 2006. Shortly thereafter, they traveled to London to start the recording of their first full-length album with producer/mixer Yoad Nevo, perhaps best known for his work with Jem, Bryan Adams, Girls Aloud and Sugababes, but also associated with acts like Air, Pet Shop Boys, Dave Gahan & Sophie Ellis-Bextor.

During the on/off recording of their debut album, the band continued to promote themselves in their home country. Niels were no stranger to political activism after being arrested for occupying the closing youth center soon to become casino in central Gothenburg 1997. Their commitment, disdain for the establishment and a lack of venues in the Gothenburg area, lead to a great marketing campaign. The band starting Guerilla gigging at Hotels, libraries and retail shops to amazing responses.

Roenik released their second full-length album 'Stars' on 28 May 2014 which included the single 'I'm Still Here'. A video for 'I'm Still Here' was released on the band's YouTube channel.
